Founded in 1995 by Liza Grossman, Contemporary Youth Orchestra (CYO) is the only youth orchestra in the United States dedicated to the study and performance of contemporary orchestral literature. The orchestra is in residence at Cuyahoga Community College in Cleveland, Ohio, United States.  Contemporary Youth Orchestra and Liza Grossman are the recipients of several awards including the ASCAP Award for Adventurous Programming, the Northern Ohio Live Award of Achievement and the Sunshine Award from Young Audiences for excellence in arts education.

Music

Contemporary Youth Orchestra is a full orchestra that rehearses weekly at Cuyahoga Community College. CYO's regular season consists of 3-4 concerts each year, highlighted by collaborations with internationally recognized performers and composers. Joan Tower, Christopher Rouse, and Valerie Coleman have been recently featured on concert programs and recent guest performers include Chris Thile, yMusic and Luca Mundaca.  

CYO continues to champion up and coming composers by partnering with Kinds of Kings through the Bouman Fellowship that will bring a new work by a fellowship recipient to Cleveland to work directly with CYO musicians. CYO has commissioned and premiered dozens of new works and concerti, all with the composers present. In December, CYO will premiere a Triple Concerto written by Pascal Le Boeuf for the percussion duo, arx duo and violinist, Barbora Kolarova. Also on that program is the US premiere of Vince Mendoza's Concerto for Orchestra.

Rock the Orchestra

The orchestra's annual series 'Rock the Orchestra' features a different performer or band every year.

See also
Cleveland Orchestra Youth Orchestra
Cleveland Youth Wind Symphony

References

External links
[https://cyorchestra.org/ Contemporary Youth Orchestra Official Website
Kris Morron named CYO Music Director

Musical groups from Cleveland
Musical groups established in 1995
1995 establishments in Ohio
Youth organizations based in Ohio
Orchestras based in Ohio